Henry Kristian Larsen (May 16, 1914 – August 14, 1986) was a Danish field hockey player who competed in the 1936 Summer Olympics.

He was born in Vig, Trundholm, Zealand and died in Kalundborg.

In 1936 he was a member of the Danish team which was eliminated in the group stage of the Olympic tournament. He played one match as halfback.

External links
 

1914 births
1986 deaths
Danish male field hockey players
Olympic field hockey players of Denmark
Field hockey players at the 1936 Summer Olympics
People from Kalundborg
Sportspeople from Region Zealand